Warroad International Memorial Airport , also known as Swede Carlson Field, is a public use airport in Roseau County, Minnesota, United States. It is owned by the City of Warroad and located two nautical miles (4 km) northwest of its central business district. This airport is included in the National Plan of Integrated Airport Systems for 2017–2021, which categorized it as a general aviation facility.

Facilities and aircraft 
Warroad International Memorial Airport covers an area of 320 acres (129 ha) at an elevation of 1,076 feet (328 m) above mean sea level. It has two runways: 13/31 is 5,400 by 100 feet (1,646 x 30 m) with an asphalt surface and 4/22 is 2,987 by 150 feet (910 x 46 m) with a turf surface.

For the 12-month period ending July 31, 2013, the airport had 9,000 general aviation aircraft operations, an average of 25 per day. In March 2017, there were 20 aircraft based at this airport: 13 single-engine, 6 multi-engine and 1 jet.

Airport services include a US Customs office.

References

External links 
 Aerial image as of April 1991 from USGS The National Map
 

Airports in Minnesota
Buildings and structures in Roseau County, Minnesota
Transportation in Roseau County, Minnesota